"√69" is the second single by Japanese band Antic Cafe. The songs are featured on the Amedama Rock album with songs from "Candyholic".   The song peaked at No. 88 on the Japanese singles chart.

Track listing

 "Odoru Meruhen Tokei" (踊るメルヘン時計) - 4:09
 "Pairing" (ペアリング) - 5:29

References

An Cafe songs
2004 singles
2004 songs
Loop Ash Records singles
Song articles with missing songwriters